"Let Me Love You" is a song by Belgian Electro house artist DJ Rebel and Congolese-Swedish singer Mohombi featuring Shaggy. The song comes from his upcoming album. It contains samples of music from the tradition Algerian song "Abdel Kader" sung by Algerian artists Cheb Khaled, Rachid Taha and Faudel. The song was released on 1 August 2016.

Background
"Let Me Love You" contains sampling of an Algerian traditional song, which was taken from an even more famous Algerian Folk song called "Abdel Kader" (1993). DJ Rebel sampled the musical refrain from it into his new single, with new English language lyrics written by Mohombi and Shaggy. Shaggy and Mohombi previously worked together in "I Need Your Love" (2014), credited to Shaggy, Mohombi, Faydee and Costi, a hit that received commercial success.

Music video
The music video for the song was released on 1 August 2016, on DJ Rebel official channel. The video directed by Alex Ceaușu features the three credited artists DJ Rebel, Mohombi and Shaggy, with many models and dancers appears throughout the video. Shot in Romania (The Flag is seen), DJ Rebel takes his turntables stuff to the beach, where the party has started. Mohombi performs the song with DJ Rebel in the background while the girls are dancing. In a second verse, Mohombi is shown singing to his love interest. Shaggy appears in the third verse of the video joining the party. The video ends with all dancers around DJ Rebel.

Track listing
Digital download
 "Let Me Love You"  – 3:33

Credits
 Turntablist, arrangement – DJ Rebel
 Vocals – Mohombi, Shaggy
 Lyrics – Kevin Leyers, Mohombi, Shaggy
 Label: United Music Group

Release history

References

2016 songs
2016 singles
Mohombi songs
Shaggy (musician) songs
Songs written by Mohombi
Songs written by Shaggy (musician)